Warte is a town located in Rawanduz  district in Erbil Governorate, Kurdistan Region in Iraq. It lies 36 km from the city of Rawanduz and lies 30 km from the city of Ranya.

References

Populated places in Erbil Governorate
Kurdish settlements in Erbil Governorate